The A4 Autoroute, also known as autoroute de l'Est, is a French autoroute that travels  between the cities of Paris and Strasbourg. It forms parts of European routes E25 and E50. It is France's second longest after the A10 autoroute.

Its construction began in the 1970s near Paris. The first section between Paris's Porte de Bercy and Joinville-le-Pont opened in 1974 with a single carriageway. A second carriageway was added in 1975, and the following sections between Joinville and Metz were opened in 1975 and 1976. Former autoroutes A32 and A34 were integrated into the A4 in 1982.

From Paris, the autoroute passes the new town of Marne-la-Vallée and Disneyland Paris. It continues on to some of the major cities of France's northeast, including Rheims and Metz, before terminating in Strasbourg. Local roads provide a connection to southern Germany.

Its westernmost part between the Périphérique and the A86 ring road in Paris is reputed to be one of the busiest sections of road in Europe, with 257,000 vehicles a day recorded in 2002.

History

List of Exits and Junctions

List of Tolls

European Routes

References

External links

A4 autoroute in Saratlas
Fiche autoroutière de l'A4

A04